Mary Eales (died  1718) was a writer of the cookery and confectionary book Mrs Mary Eales's Receipts, published in 1718. The little that is known about her life is from the title pages of the various editions of her book.

It is possible she died in 1718, but it is certain she was dead by 1733, when editions of her book referred to her as "the late ingenious Mrs Eales". Although her book stated she was the confectioner to King William and Queen Anne, there is no record of her in the accounts of the royal household.

Life
Little is known about Eales's life. Her biographer, the historian Sara Pennell, observes that all the information about her is from her publications. Her date of birth and parentage are unknown, and it is not known whether the surname Eales is her birth name, or one acquired through marriage.

It is known that Eales published her book, Mrs Mary Eales's Receipts as early as 1711, as a manuscript with that date is "a copy from Mrs Eales book"; the manuscript was owned by Elizabeth Sloane, the daughter of Sir Hans Sloane. Manuscript copies were also in circulation in 1713, at a cost of five guineas.

The first printed edition appeared in 1718, comprising 100 pages; there was no preface. The title page stated that Eales was the "Confectioner to her late majesty Queen Anne". According to Pennell, an examination of the records of the Lord Steward for Queen Anne's household show no-one under the name Mary Eales employed. The historian Gilly Lehman suggests that although not an employee of the household, Eales may have been an outside supplier who provided confections to the court which the royal kitchen did not or could not provide. By the 1733 edition, the description had been amended to "confectioner to their late majesties King William and Queen Anne".

The word "jam" made an early appearance in Mrs Mary Eales's Receipts, although her recipe differed from the norms of the time, by not being a solid food to eat in slices, but a semi-runny food, stored in jars and sealed with a paper lid. The book also contains the first recorded recipe in English for ice cream. Although there are records concerning ice cream being available in Britain as early as 1671, Eales was the first to record it in print. The historian Kate Colquhoun describes the first recipe as "confident, practical and details, if slightly roundabout". The recipe is a simple one, according to the food historian Laura Mason, and consisted of cream sweetened and with a fruit flavouring added. The cookery writer Elizabeth David considers that Eales's recipe was derived from a French source. The recipe, titled "To Ice Cream", reads:

By the time of the 1733 edition of her book was published—retitled as The Compleat Confectioner—the frontispiece referred to "the late ingenious Mrs Eales", and stated that the issue had been "published with the consent of her executors". It is not clear when she died, but Pennell suggests it may have been the Mary Eales recorded as being buried in St Paul's, Covent Garden, on 11 January 1718; if it is the same person, then Eales was married with a daughter, Elizabeth, to whom she left her estate.

Notes and references

Notes

References

Sources

External links
 

18th-century English women writers
English food writers
English non-fiction writers
Place of death missing
Women cookbook writers
History of British cuisine